USG may refer to:

Business

 Unix Systems Group, a former division of Novell
 USG Corporation (formerly United States Gypsum Corporation), a construction materials manufacturer
 U.S. Gauge, a division of Ametek, manufacturer of pressure and temperature measurement products

Education
 University System of Georgia, United States
 Universities at Shady Grove, in Rockville, Maryland, United States

Music
 U.S.G., a hip hop collective from Stonebridge, London, see K Koke
 Unison Square Garden, a Japanese band
 Urban Sound Gallery, Brooklyn based music collaboration, see Ron Trent

Technology
 Medical ultrasonography, a diagnostic imaging technique
 Urine specific gravity, a measure of urine concentration or relative density

Other uses
 Ulysses S. Grant (1822–1885), US president and army general
 Under-Secretary-General of the United Nations, UN senior official
 Undergraduate Student Government at Stony Brook University
 Unhealthy for Sensitive Groups, one of NowCast air quality levels
 Union Saint-Gilloise, a Belgian professional football club
 United States Government
 United States Guards, World War I era US National army formation
 USgamer, a video game news website owned by Gamer Network